The Primetime Emmy Award for Outstanding Directing for Variety Special is awarded to one television special each year. After being grouped together, the category was initiated alongside Outstanding Directing for a Variety Series in 2009. From the 1980s to 2000s, specials competed alongside series for Outstanding Directing for a Variety, Music or Comedy Program.

In the following list, the first titles listed in gold are the winners; those not in gold are nominees, which are listed in alphabetical order. The years given are those in which the ceremonies took place:



Winners and nominations

Outstanding Directing for a Comedy-Variety or Music Special

1970s

1980s

Outstanding Directing for a Variety Special

2000s

2010s

2020s

Notes

References

External links
 Academy of Television Arts and Sciences website

Directing for a Variety Special